The SJFA West Region Premiership (also known as the McBookie.com West Region Premiership for sponsorship reasons) was a semi-professional football league run by the West Region of the Scottish Junior Football Association, and was the highest tier of league competition for its member clubs. 

Formerly known as the West of Scotland Super League Premier Division, the league was created in 2002 with the amalgamation of the top leagues of the Central and Ayrshire regions.

It was abolished in 2020 when all SJFA West Region clubs moved to join the newly-formed senior West of Scotland Football League. 

The final champions and most successful club were Auchinleck Talbot, who won seven league titles. A total of 32 clubs competed in the league.

History 
Initially two clubs were automatically relegated to the Super League First Division at the end of each season, and replaced by the clubs placed first and second in that division. A relegation play-off was added in 2006–07 which saw the club finishing third bottom contest a two-legged play-off against the team which finished third in the Super League First Division. 

From the 2007–08 season, the winners of the league were eligible to enter the senior Scottish Cup at its earliest stage, with Pollok being the first champions to take part in the Scottish Cup.

In 2017 West Region clubs voted to organise all leagues on a regionwide basis and as a result, the Super League Premier Division was rebranded as the West Region Premiership for the 2018–19 season. The league was also expanded to sixteen clubs, and with clubs were relegated to a rebranded Championship also consisting of sixteen teams.

The final season was curtailed due to the COVID-19 pandemic.

Champions and season summaries

Note: Champions in bold completed the 'Double' by also winning the Junior Cup.

References

External links
West Region Super Premier League at Non-League Scotland (archive version, 2007-08 membership)

1
2002 establishments in Scotland
Sports leagues established in 2002
Sports leagues disestablished in 2020
2020 disestablishments in Scotland
Defunct football leagues in Scotland
Defunct Scottish Junior Football Association leagues